Vladimir Steklov may refer to:

 Vladimir Steklov (mathematician) (1864–1926), Russian mathematician
 Vladimir Steklov (actor) (born 1948), Russian actor